Larkrise may refer to:
 Lark Rise, a 1939 novel by Flora Thompson
 Larkrise Primary School, a school in Oxford, England